, née , is a Japanese figure skating coach and former competitor. She won gold medals at the 1977 Nebelhorn Trophy, 1977 Grand Prix International St. Gervais, and 1980–81 Japan Championships.

Kobayashi has coached Mao Asada, Risa Shoji, and Haruna Suzuki.

Competitive highlights

References 

1961 births
Japanese female single skaters
Japanese figure skating coaches
Living people
Sportspeople from Hiroshima Prefecture